A bouldering mat or crash pad is a foam pad used for protection when bouldering. Bouldering mats help prevent climbers from injuring themselves when falling from short heights. 

Bouldering mats are made in various sizes and styles. There are also bi-fold mats of other sizes and tri-fold pads that fold in thirds (which tend to be larger). Smaller, thinner mats are also used to keep shoes clean, to sit on during sit starts, or cover gaps between larger mats. 

Bouldering mats often contain two or three different kinds of foam. Softer foam below firmer, higher density foam prevents a climber's foot from sinking through the foam and either impacting the ground or getting stuck in the mat, which would increase the chance of injury. Mats are often used to cover dangerous sections of the ground below a climb, such as protruding rocks or grass tufts. Usually mats are paired with one or two spotters, who try to ensure that a falling climber lands on the mat and does so safely.

Bouldering mats often have shoulder straps so that they can be worn while hiking to and between boulders. Many mats also often have pockets for storage, or straps that allow climbers to turn the pad into a pack by stuffing other gear inside the folds. 

Bi-fold mats come in three designs: "taco", "hinge", and "hybrid". Taco mats are a single section of foam that bends in middle when folded. Hinge mats are two sections of foam connected with a hinge. Hybrid mats feature a single bending section of foam on top of two separate hinge-connected pads.

References

Climbing equipment
Bouldering